Shujaat Ahmed Khan is a Pakistani politician who was a Member of the Provincial Assembly of the Punjab, from 2002 to May 2018.

Early life and education
He was born on 20 April 1947 in Narowal.
He belongs to a Rajput Khokhar tribe. 
He has a degree of Bachelor of Science which he obtained in 1966 from Government Degree College in Sheikhupura.

Political career
He was elected to the Provincial Assembly of the Punjab as a candidate of Pakistan Muslim League (Q) (PML-Q) from Constituency PP-136 (Narowal-V) in 2002 Pakistani general election. He received 32,964 votes and defeated Chaudhry Masood Ahmed Basra, a candidate of Pakistan Peoples Party (PPP).

He was re-elected to the Provincial Assembly of the Punjab as a candidate of PML-Q from Constituency PP-136 (Narowal-V) in 2008 Pakistani general election. He received 17,795 votes and defeated Abida Raza Saqlain Bukhari, a candidate of Pakistan Muslim League (N) (PML-N).

He was re-elected to the Provincial Assembly of the Punjab as a candidate of PML-N from Constituency PP-136 (Narowal-V) in 2013 Pakistani general election. He received 47,475 votes and defeated an independent candidate, Muhammad Wakeel khan Manj.

In December 2013, he was appointed as Parliamentary Secretary for colonies, provincial disaster management authority.

References

Living people
Punjab MPAs 2013–2018
1947 births
Pakistan Muslim League (N) politicians
Punjab MPAs 2002–2007
Punjab MPAs 2008–2013